
Żuromin County is a unit of territorial administration and local government (powiat) in Masovian Voivodeship, east-central Poland. It came into being on January 1, 1999, as a result of the Polish local government reforms passed in 1998.

As of 2019 its total population is 38,688, out of which the population of Żuromin is 8,867, that of Bieżuń is 1,846, that of Lubowidz is 1,684, and the rural population is 26,291.

Neighbouring counties
Żuromin County is bordered by Działdowo County to the north-east, Mława County to the east, Płońsk County to the south-east, Sierpc County to the south-west, and Rypin County and Brodnica County to the west.

Administrative division
The county is subdivided into six gminas (three urban-rural and three rural). These are listed in the following table, in descending order of population.

References

 
Land counties of Masovian Voivodeship